Auckland East was a New Zealand electorate, situated in the east of Auckland. It existed between 1861 and 1887, and again between 1905 and 1946.

History
The Auckland East electorate was established for the 1860–1861 election, when the City of Auckland electorate was split in half. It consisted of most of modern Auckland's central business district. Its boundaries remained largely static until 1875–1876 election, when the focus of the electorate shifted eastwards, making room for Auckland North electorate. It was abolished in the 1887 election, with most of its territory being absorbed by the neighbouring Parnell electorate.

At the 1905 election, a new electorate of the same name was created, again by abolishing a multi-member seat called City of Auckland. The boundaries of the new Auckland East were similar to those of the original, although its borders often shifted. By the 1938 election, it had lost most of the central business district, and was more focused on Parnell, Newmarket, and Grafton. It was abolished in the 1946 election, with most of its territory becoming part of a re-established Parnell electorate.

The first seat called Auckland East existed before political parties. The second seat was initially held by the Liberals, but later swung to the rising Labour Party, with the United Party (the Liberals' successor) capturing it only once after its initial loss. The seat also briefly belonged to the Reform Party, which captured it in a by-election but was unable to keep it.

In 1927 the Representation Commission proposed altering the boundaries of the  electorate; which if confirmed would have made the electorate "dry" or no-licence, and without an authority which could issue temporary licences for the Ellerslie and Alexandra Park raceways. Following objections, the boundary between the Parnell and Auckland East electorates was adjusted to include a hotel in the Parnell electorate (so retaining the licensing committee). 

Election results
Key

Election results

1943 election

1938 election

1935 election

1931 election

1928 election

1925 election

1922 election

1921 by-election

1919 election

1914 election

1911 election

1910 by-election

1908 election

1905 election

1881 election

References

Historical electorates of New Zealand
1860 establishments in New Zealand
1946 disestablishments in New Zealand
1905 establishments in New Zealand
1887 disestablishments in New Zealand
Politics of the Auckland Region